is a former Japanese football player.

Club statistics

References

External links
j-league

1987 births
Living people
Osaka Gakuin University alumni
Association football people from Miyagi Prefecture
Japanese footballers
J2 League players
Roasso Kumamoto players
Association football midfielders